The following outline is provided as an overview of and topical guide to robotics:

Robotics is a  branch of mechanical  engineering, electrical engineering and computer science that deals with the design, construction, operation, and application of robots, as well as computer systems for their control, sensory feedback, and information processing. These technologies deal with automated machines that can take the place of humans in dangerous environments or manufacturing processes, or resemble humans in appearance, behaviour, and or cognition. Many of today's robots are inspired by nature contributing to the field of bio-inspired robotics.

The word "robot" was introduced to the public by Czech writer Karel Čapek in his play R.U.R. (Rossum's Universal Robots), published in 1920. The term "robotics" was coined by Isaac Asimov in his 1941 science fiction short-story "Liar!"

Nature of robotics 
Robotics can be described as:

 An applied science – scientific knowledge transferred into a physical environment.
 A branch of computer science –
 A branch of electrical engineering –
 A branch of mechanical engineering –
 Research and development –
 A branch of technology   –

Branches of robotics 

 Adaptive control – control method used by a controller which must adapt to a controlled system with parameters which vary, or are initially uncertain. For example, as an aircraft flies, its mass will slowly decrease as a result of fuel consumption; a control law is needed that adapts itself to such changing conditions.
 Aerial robotics – development of unmanned aerial vehicles (UAVs), commonly known as drones, aircraft without a human pilot aboard. Their flight is controlled either autonomously by onboard computers or by the remote control of a pilot on the ground or in another vehicle.
 Android science – interdisciplinary framework for studying human interaction and cognition based on the premise that a very humanlike robot (that is, an android) can elicit human-directed social responses in human beings.
 Anthrobotics – science of developing and studying robots that are either entirely or in some way human-like.
 Artificial intelligence – the intelligence of machines and the branch of computer science that aims to create it.
 Artificial neural networks – a mathematical model inspired by biological neural networks. 
 Autonomous car – an autonomous vehicle capable of fulfilling the human transportation capabilities of a traditional car
 Autonomous research robotics –
 Bayesian network –
 BEAM robotics – a style of robotics that primarily uses simple analogue circuits instead of a microprocessor in order to produce an unusually simple design (in comparison to traditional mobile robots) that trades flexibility for robustness and efficiency in performing the task for which it was designed.
 Behavior-based robotics – the branch of robotics that incorporates modular or behavior based AI (BBAI).
 Bio-inspired robotics – making robots that are inspired by biological systems. Biomimicry and bio-inspired design are sometimes confused. Biomimicry is copying the nature while bio-inspired design is learning from nature and making a mechanism that is simpler and more effective than the system observed in nature.
 Biomimetic  – see Bionics.
 Biomorphic robotics – a sub-discipline of robotics focused upon emulating the mechanics, sensor systems, computing structures and methodologies used by animals.
 Bionics  – also known as biomimetics, biognosis, biomimicry, or bionical creativity engineering is the application of biological methods and systems found in nature to the study and design of engineering systems and modern technology.
 Biorobotics – a study of how to make robots that emulate or simulate living biological organisms mechanically or even chemically.
 Cloud robotics – is a field of robotics that attempts to invoke cloud technologies such as cloud computing, cloud storage, and other Internet technologies centered around the benefits of converged infrastructure and shared services for robotics.
 Cognitive robotics – views animal cognition as a starting point for the development of robotic information processing, as opposed to more traditional Artificial Intelligence techniques.
 Clustering –
 Computational neuroscience – study of brain function in terms of the information processing properties of the structures that make up the nervous system.
 Robot control – a study of controlling robots
 Robotics conventions –
 Data mining Techniques –
 Degrees of freedom – in mechanics, the degree of freedom (DOF) of a mechanical system is the number of independent parameters that define its configuration. It is the number of parameters that determine the state of a physical system and is important to the analysis of systems of bodies in mechanical engineering, aeronautical engineering, robotics, and structural engineering.
 Developmental robotics – a methodology that uses metaphors from neural development and developmental psychology to develop the mind for autonomous robots
 Digital control – a branch of control theory that uses digital computers to act as system controllers.
 Digital image processing – the use of computer algorithms to perform image processing on digital images.
 Dimensionality reduction – the process of reducing the number of random variables under consideration, and can be divided into feature selection and feature extraction.
 Distributed robotics –
 Electronic stability control – is a computerized technology that improves the safety of a vehicle's stability by detecting and reducing loss of traction (skidding).
 Evolutionary computation –
 Evolutionary robotics – a methodology that uses evolutionary computation to develop controllers for autonomous robots
 Extended Kalman filter –
 Flexible Distribution functions –
 Feedback control and regulation –
 Human–computer interaction  – a study, planning and design of the interaction between people (users) and computers
 Human robot interaction – a study of interactions between humans and robots
 Intelligent vehicle technologies – comprise electronic, electromechanical, and electromagnetic devices - usually silicon micromachined components operating in conjunction with computer controlled devices and radio transceivers to provide precision repeatability functions (such as in robotics artificial intelligence systems) emergency warning validation performance reconstruction.
 Computer vision –
 Machine vision –
 Kinematics  – study of motion, as applied to robots. This includes both the design of linkages to perform motion, their power, control and stability; also their planning, such as choosing a sequence of movements to achieve a broader task.
 Laboratory robotics – the act of using robots in biology or chemistry labs
 Robot learning – learning to perform tasks such as obstacle avoidance, control and various other motion-related tasks
 Direct manipulation interface – In computer science, direct manipulation is a human–computer interaction style which involves continuous representation of objects of interest and rapid, reversible, and incremental actions and feedback. The intention is to allow a user to directly manipulate objects presented to them, using actions that correspond at least loosely to the physical world.
 Manifold learning –
 Microrobotics – a field of miniature robotics, in particular mobile robots with characteristic dimensions less than 1 mm
 Motion planning – (a.k.a., the "navigation problem", the "piano mover's problem") is a term used in robotics for the process of detailing a task into discrete motions.
 Motor control – information processing related activities carried out by the central nervous system that organize the musculoskeletal system to create coordinated movements and skilled actions. 
 Nanorobotics – the emerging technology field creating machines or robots whose components are at or close to the scale of a nanometer (10−9 meters).
 Passive dynamics – refers to the dynamical behavior of actuators, robots, or organisms when not drawing energy from a supply (e.g., batteries, fuel, ATP). 
 Programming by Demonstration – an End-user development technique for teaching a computer or a robot new behaviors by demonstrating the task to transfer directly instead of programming it through machine commands.
 Quantum robotics – a subfield of robotics that deals with using quantum computers to run robotics algorithms more quickly than digital computers can.
 Rapid prototyping – automatic construction of physical objects via additive manufacturing from virtual models in computer aided design (CAD) software, transforming them into thin, virtual, horizontal cross-sections and then producing successive layers until the items are complete.  As of June 2011, used for making models, prototype parts, and production-quality parts in relatively small numbers.
 Reinforcement learning – an area of machine learning in computer science, concerned with how an agent ought to take actions in an environment so as to maximize some notion of cumulative reward.
 Robot kinematics – applies geometry to the study of the movement of multi-degree of freedom kinematic chains that form the structure of robotic systems.
 Robot locomotion – collective name for the various methods that robots use to transport themselves from place to place.
 Robot programming –
 Robotic mapping – the goal for an autonomous robot to be able to construct (or use ) a map or floor plan and to localize itself in it
 Robotic surgery – computer-assisted surgery, and robotically-assisted surgery are terms for technological developments that use robotic systems to aid in surgical procedures.
 Robot-assisted heart surgery –
 Sensors – (also called detector) is a converter that measures a physical quantity and converts it into a signal which can be read by an observer or by an (today mostly electronic) instrument.
 Simultaneous localization and mapping – a technique used by robots and autonomous vehicles to build up a map within an unknown environment (without a priori knowledge), or to update a map within a known environment (with a priori knowledge from a given map), while at the same time keeping track of their current location.
 Software engineering – the application of a systematic, disciplined, quantifiable approach to the design, development, operation, and maintenance of software, and the study of these approaches; that is, the application of engineering to software.
 Speech processing – study of speech signals and the processing methods of these signals. The signals are usually processed in a digital representation, so speech processing can be regarded as a special case of digital signal processing, applied to speech signal. Aspects of speech processing includes the acquisition, manipulation, storage, transfer and output of digital speech signals.
 Support vector machines – supervised learning models with associated learning algorithms that analyze data and recognize patterns, used for classification and regression analysis. 
 Swarm robotics  –  involves large numbers of mostly simple physical robots. Their actions may seek to incorporate emergent behavior observed in social insects (swarm intelligence).
 Ant robotics – swarm robots that can communicate via markings, similar to ants that lay and follow pheromone trails.
 Telepresence – refers to a set of technologies which allow a person to feel as if they were present, to give the appearance of being present, or to have an effect, via telerobotics, at a place other than their true location.
 Ubiquitous robotics – integrating robotic technologies with technologies from the fields of ubiquitous and pervasive computing, sensor networks, and ambient intelligence.

Contributing fields 
Robotics incorporates aspects of many disciplines including electronics, engineering, mechanics, software and arts.  The design and control of robots relies on many fields knowledge, including:

 General
 Aerospace –
Biology –
 Biomechanics –
 Computer science –
 Artificial Intelligence –
 Computational linguistics –
 Cloud computing –
 Cybernetics –
 Modal logic –
 Engineering –
 Acoustical engineering –
 Automotive engineering –
 Chemical engineering –
 Control engineering –
 Electrical engineering –
 Electronic engineering –
 Mechanical engineering –
 Mechatronics engineering –
 Microelectromechanical engineering –
 Nanoengineering –
 Optical engineering –
 Safety engineering –
 Software engineering –
 Telecommunications –
 Fiction – Robotics technology and its implications are major themes in science fiction and have provided inspiration for robotics development and cause for ethical concerns.  Robots are portrayed in short stories and novels, in movies, in TV shows, in theatrical productions, in web based media, in computer games, and in comic books. See List of fictional robots and androids.
 Film – See Robots in film.
 Literature – fictional autonomous artificial servants have a long history in human culture. Today's most pervasive trope of robots, developing self-awareness and rebelling against their creators, dates only from the early 20th century.  See Robots in literature.
 The Three Laws of Robotics in popular culture
 Military science –
Psychology –
 Cognitive science –
 Behavioral science –
Philosophy –
Ethics –
 Physics –
 Dynamics –
 Kinematics –
 Fields of application – additionally, contributing fields include the specific field(s) a particular robot is being designed for.  Expertise in surgical procedures and anatomy, for instance would be required for designing robotic surgery applications.

Related fields 
 Building automation  –
 Home automation –
Assistive technology
Cloud robotics

Robots

Types of robots 

Autonomous robots – robots that are not controlled by humans:
 Aerobot – robot capable of independent flight on other planets
 Android  – humanoid robot; resembling the shape or form of a human
 Automaton  – early self-operating robot, performing exactly the same actions, over and over
 Animatronic – a robot that is usually used for theme parks and movie/tvs show set.
 Autonomous vehicle  – vehicle equipped with an autopilot system, which is capable of driving from one point to another without input from a human operator
 Ballbot – dynamically-stable mobile robot designed to balance on a single spherical wheel (i.e., a ball)
 Cyborg   – also known as a cybernetic organism, a being with both biological and artificial (e.g. electronic, mechanical or robotic) parts
 Explosive ordnance disposal robot  – mobile robot designed to assess whether an object contains explosives; some carry detonators that can be deposited at the object and activated after the robot withdraws
 Gynoid  – humanoid robot designed to look like a human female
 Hexapod (walker) – a six-legged walking robot, using a simple insect-like locomotion
  – reprogrammable, multifunctional manipulator designed to move material, parts, tools, or specialized devices through variable programmed motions for the performance of a variety of tasks
 3D printer
 Insect robot  – small robot designed to imitate insect behaviors rather than complex human behaviors.
 Microbot – microscopic robots designed to go into the human body and cure diseases
 Military robot – exosuit which is capable of merging with its user for enhanced strength, speed, handling, etc.
 Mobile robot  – self-propelled and self-contained robot that is capable of moving over a mechanically unconstrained course.
 Cruise missile  – robot-controlled guided missile that carries an explosive payload.
 Music entertainment robot  – robot created to perform music entertainment by playing custom made instrument or human developed instruments.
 Nanobot  – the same as a microbot, but smaller. The components are at or close to the scale of a nanometer (10−9 meters).
 Prosthetic robot  –  programmable manipulator or device replacing a missing human limb.
 Rover – a robot with wheels designed to walk on other planets' terrain
 Service robot  – machines that extend human capabilities.
 Snakebot  – robot or robotic component resembling a tentacle or elephant's trunk, where many small actuators are used to allow continuous curved motion of a robot component, with many degrees of freedom. This is usually applied to snake-arm robots, which use this as a flexible manipulator. A rarer application is the snakebot, where the entire robot is mobile and snake-like, so as to gain access through narrow spaces.
 Surgical robot  – remote manipulator used for keyhole surgery
 Walking robot – robot capable of locomotion by walking. Owing to the difficulties of balance, two-legged walking robots have so far been rare, and most walking robots have used insect-like multilegged walking gaits.

By mode of locomotion 
Mobile robots may be classified by:

 The environment in which they travel:
 Land or home robots. They are most commonly wheeled, but also include legged robots with two or more legs (humanoid, or resembling animals or insects).
 Aerial robots are usually referred to as unmanned aerial vehicles (UAVs).
 Underwater robots are usually called autonomous underwater vehicles (AUVs).
 Polar robots, designed to navigate icy, crevasse filled environments
 The device they use to move, mainly:
 Legged robot – human-like legs (i.e. an android) or animal-like legs
 Tracks
 Wheeled robot

Robot components and design features 

Actuator – motor that translates control signals into mechanical movement. The control signals are usually electrical but may, more rarely, be pneumatic or hydraulic. The power supply may likewise be any of these. It is common for electrical control to be used to modulate a high-power pneumatic or hydraulic motor.
Linear actuator  – form of motor that generates a linear movement directly.
Delta robot – tripod linkage, used to construct fast-acting manipulators with a wide range of movement.
Drive power – energy source or sources for the robot actuators.
 End-effector – accessory device or tool specifically designed for attachment to the robot wrist or tool mounting plate to enable the robot to perform its intended task. (Examples may include gripper, spot-weld gun, arc-weld gun, spray- paint gun, or any other application tools.)
Forward chaining – process in which events or received data are considered by an entity to intelligently adapt its behavior.
 Haptic – tactile feedback technology using the operator's sense of touch. Also sometimes applied to robot manipulators with their own touch sensitivity.
Hexapod (platform) – movable platform using six linear actuators. Often used in flight simulators and fairground rides, they also have applications as a robotic manipulator.
 See Stewart platform
 – control of mechanical force and movement, generated by the application of liquid under pressure. c.f. pneumatics.
Kalman filter – mathematical technique to estimate the value of a sensor measurement, from a series of intermittent and noisy values.
Klann linkage – simple linkage for walking robots.
 – gripper. A robotic 'hand'.
 – articulated robot or manipulator based on a number of kinematic chains, actuators and joints, in parallel. c.f. serial manipulator.
Remote manipulator   – manipulator under direct human control, often used for work with hazardous materials.
   – articulated robot or manipulator with a single series kinematic chain of actuators. c.f. parallel manipulator.
 Muting – deactivation of a presence-sensing safeguarding device during a portion of the robot cycle.
 Pendant – Any portable control device that permits an operator to control the robot from within the restricted envelope (space) of the robot.
  – control of mechanical force and movement, generated by the application of compressed gas. c.f. hydraulics.
 Servo – motor that moves to and maintains a set position under command, rather than continuously moving
 Servomechanism – automatic device that uses error-sensing negative feedback to correct the performance of a mechanism
 Single point of control – ability to operate the robot such that initiation or robot motion from one source of control is possible only from that source and cannot be overridden from another source
 Slow speed control – mode of robot motion control where the velocity of the robot is limited to allow persons sufficient time either to withdraw the hazardous motion or stop the robot
Stepper motor – motor whose rotation is divided into intervals called 'steps'. The motor can then rotate through a controlled number of steps which allows an exact awareness of the rotated distance.
 – movable platform using six linear actuators, hence also known as a Hexapod
Subsumption architecture – robot architecture that uses a modular, bottom-up design beginning with the least complex behavioral tasks
 Teach mode – control state that allows the generation and storage of positional data points effected by moving the robot arm through a path of intended motions

Specific robots 

 Aura (satellite) – robotic spacecraft launched by NASA in 2004 which collects atmospheric data from Earth
 Chandra X-ray Observatory – robotic spacecraft launched by NASA in 1999 to collect astronomical data
 Justin
 Robonaut – development project conducted by NASA to create humanoid robots capable of using space tools and working in similar environments to suited astronauts
 Unimate – the first off-the-shelf industrial robot, of 1961

Real robots by region

Robots from Australia
GuRoo
UWA Telerobot

Robots from Britain
Black Knight
eSTAR
Freddy II
George
Robop
Shadow Hand
Silver Swan
Talisman UUV
Wheelbarrow
Ameca

Robots from Canada
ANAT AMI-100
ANATROLLER ARE-100
ANATROLLER ARI-100
ANATROLLER ARI-50
ANATROLLER Dusty Duct Destroyer
Canadarm2
Dextre
hitchBOT

Robots from China
FemiSapien
Meinü robot
RoboSapien
Robosapien v2
RS Media
Sanbot robot
Xianxingzhe
Xiaoyi (Robot)

Robots from Croatia
DOK-ING EOD
TIOSS

Robots from Czech Republic
SyRoTek

Robots from France
Air-Cobot – collaborative mobile robot able to inspect aircraft during maintenance operations
Digesting Duck
Jessiko
Nabaztag
Nao

Robots from Germany
BionicKangaroo – biomimetic robot model designed by Festo
Care-Providing Robot FRIEND
LAURON
Marvin

Robots from Italy
 iCub –
IsaacRobot
WalkMan 
Leonardo's robot

Robots from Japan
AIBO
ASIMO
EMIEW
EMIEW 2
Enon
Evolta
Gakutensoku
HAL 5
HOAP
Ibuki
KHR-1
Omnibot
Plen
QRIO
R.O.B.
SCARA
Toyota Partner Robot
Wakamaru

Robots from Mexico
Don Cuco El Guapo

Robots from the Netherlands
Adelbrecht
Flame
Phobot
Senster

Robots from New Zealand
The Trons

Robots from Portugal
RAPOSA

Robots from Qatar
Robot jockey

Robots from Russia (or former Soviet Union)
Lunokhod 1
Lunokhod 2
Teletank

Robots from South Korea
Albert Hubo
EveR-1
HUBO
MAHRU
Musa

Robots from Spain
Maggie
REEM
Tico

Robots from Switzerland
Alice mobile robot –
E-puck mobile robot –
Pocketdelta robot –
Shameer shami robot –

Robots from the United States
Albert One –
Allen –
ATHLETE –
Atlas –
Baxter –
Ballbot –
avbotz Baracuda XIV –
Berkeley Lower Extremity Exoskeleton –
BigDog –
Boe-Bot –
CISBOT –
Coco –
Cog –
Crusher –
Dragon Runner –
EATR –
Elektro –
Entomopter –
Haile –
Hardiman –
HERO –
Johns Hopkins Beast –
Kismet –
Leonardo –
LOPES –
LORAX –
Nomad 200 –
Nomad rover –
Octobot (robot) –
Opportunity rover –
Programmable Universal Machine for Assembly –
Push the Talking Trash Can –
RB5X –
Robonaut –
Shakey the Robot –
Sojourner –
Spirit rover –
Turtle –
Unimate –
Zoë –
Pleo –

Robots from Vietnam
TOPIO –

International robots
European Robotic Arm –
Curiosity Rover for NASA on Mars Science Laboratory space mission –

Fictional robots by region

Fictional robots from the United Kingdom

From British literature
HAL 9000 (Arthur C. Clarke) –

From British radio
Marvin the Paranoid Android (Douglas Adams) –

From British television
Kryten (Rob Grant, Doug Naylor, David Ross, Robert Llewellyn) {Red Dwarf} –
Talkie Toaster –  (Rob Grant, Doug Naylor, John Lenahan, David Ross) {Red Dwarf}
K-9 (Doctor Who) –
 Robotboy – (Bob Camp, Charlie Bean, Heath Kenny, Prof Moshimo, Laurence Bouvard) {Robotboy}
 K.T., Eric and Desiree in Robert's Robots

Fictional robots from the Czech Republich

From Czech plays
Daemon –  (Karel Čapek) {R.U.R. (Rossum's Universal Robots)}
Helena –  (Karel Čapek) {R.U.R. (Rossum's Universal Robots)}
Marius –  (Karel Čapek) {R.U.R. (Rossum's Universal Robots)}
Primus –  (Karel Čapek) {R.U.R. (Rossum's Universal Robots)}
Radius –  (Karel Čapek) {R.U.R. (Rossum's Universal Robots)}
Sulla –  (Karel Čapek) {R.U.R. (Rossum's Universal Robots)}

Fictional robots from France

From French ballets
Coppélia –  (Arthur Saint-Leon, Léo Delibes) {Coppélia}

From French literature
Hadaly –  (Auguste Villiers de l'Isle-Adam) {The Future Eve}

Fictional robots from Germany

From German film
Maschinenmensch –  (Fritz Lang, Thea von Harbou, Brigitte Helm) {Metropolis}

From German literature
Maschinenmensch –  (Thea von Harbou)
Olimpia –  (E. T. A. Hoffmann) {Der Sandmann}

Fictional robots from Japan

From anime
Braiger –  (Shigeo Tsubota, Tokichi Aoki) {Ginga Senpuu Braiger}
Combattler V –  (Tadao Nagahama, Saburo Yatsude) {Super Electromagnetic Robo Combattler V}
Daimos –  (Tadao Nagahama, Saburo Yatsude) {Brave Leader Daimos}
Groizer X –  (Go Nagai) {Groizer X}
Mechander Robo –  (Jaruhiko Kaido) {Mechander Robo (Gasshin Sentai Mekandaa Robo)}
Raideen –  (Yoshiyuki Tomino, Tadao Nagahama) {Brave Raideen}
Trider G7 –  (Hajime Yatate) {Invincible Robo Trider G7}

Voltes V –  (Tadao Nagahama, Saburo Yatsude) {Super Electromagnetic Machine Voltes V}

From manga
Astro Boy –  (Osamu Tezuka) {Astro Boy}
Doraemon –  (Fujiko Fujio) {Doraemon}
Getter Robo – (Go Nagai, Ken Ishikawa) {Getter Robo}
Grendizer – (Go Nagai) {UFO Robo Grendizer}
Mazinger Z – (Go Nagai) {Mazinger Z}
Tetsujin 28 – (Mitsuteru Yokoyama) {Tetsujin 28 - Go!}

Fictional robots from the United States

From American comics
Amazo –  (Gardner Fox) {DC Comics}
Annihilants –  (Alex Raymond) {Flash Gordon}

From American film
C-3PO – (George Lucas, Anthony Daniels) {Star Wars}
 ED-209 – (Paul Verhoeven, Craig Hayes, Phil Tippett) {RoboCop}
 Fix-Its – (Burton Weinstein,  Robert Cooper, Tony Hudson) {*batteries not included}
Gort –  (Robert Wise, Harry Bates, Edmund H. North, Lock Martin) {The Day the Earth Stood Still}
 Johnny Five –  (Tim Blaney, Syd Mead) {Short Circuit}
R2-D2 –  (George Lucas, Kenny Baker, Ben Burtt) {Star Wars}
Robby the Robot –  (Fred M. Wilcox, Robert Kinoshita, Frankie Darro, Marvin Miller) {Forbidden Planet}
The Terminator –  (James Cameron, Gale Anne Hurd) {The Terminator}
WALL-E and EVE – (Andrew Stanton, Ben Burtt, Elissa Knight) {WALL-E}

From American literature
Adam Link –  (Eando Binder) {I, Robot}
Gnut –  (Harry Bates) {Farewell to the Master}
Robbie –  (Isaac Asimov) {I, Robot}
The Steam Man of the Prairies –  (Edward S. Ellis) {The Steam Man of the Prairies}
Tik-Tok –  (L. Frank Baum) {Ozma of Oz}

From American television
Bender Bending Rodriguez –  (Matt Groening, David X. Cohen, John DiMaggio) {Futurama}
Bobert – (Ben Bocquelet, Kerry Shale) {The Amazing World of Gumball}
Cambot – Gypsy, Crow T. Robot, and Tom Servo (Joel Hodgson, Trace Beaulieu, Bill Corbett, Josh Weinstein, Jim Mallon, Patrick Brantseg) {Mystery Science Theater 3000}
Data –  (Gene Roddenberry, Brent Spiner) {Star Trek: The Next Generation}
Grounder and Scratch –  (Phil Hayes, Garry Chalk) {Adventures of Sonic the Hedgehog}
GIR – (Jhonen Vasquez, Rosearik Rikki Simons) {Invader Zim}
Jenny Wakeman – (Rob Renzetti, Janice Kawaye) {My Life as a Teenage Robot}
Robot B-9 –  (Irwin Allen, Robert Kinoshita, Bob May, Dick Tufeld) {Lost in Space}
XR – (Larry Miller) {Buzz Lightyear of Star Command}

History of robotics 

History of robots

Future of robotics 

 Artificial general intelligence
 Soft robotics

Robotics development and development tools 

 Arduino  – current platform of choice for small-scale robotic experimentation and  physical computing.
 CAD/CAM (computer-aided design and computer-aided manufacturing)  – these systems and their data may be integrated into robotic operations.
 Cleanroom  – environment that has a low level of environmental pollutants such as dust, airborne microbes, aerosol particles and chemical vapors; often used in robot assembly.
 Microsoft Robotics Developer Studio
 Player Project
 Robot Operating System
 Gazebo, a robotics simulator

Robotics principles 

Artificial intelligence  –  intelligence of machines and the branch of computer science that aims to create it.
Degrees of freedom  – extent to which a robot can move itself; expressed in terms of Cartesian coordinates (x, y, and z) and angular movements (yaw, pitch, and roll).
Emergent behaviour  – complicated resultant behaviour that emerges from the repeated operation of simple underlying behaviours.
 Envelope (Space), Maximum  – volume of space encompassing the maximum designed movements of all robot parts including the end-effector, workpiece, and attachments.
Humanoid   – resembling a human being in form, function, or both.
Roboethics
Three Laws of Robotics   – coined by the science fiction author Isaac Asimov, one of the first serious considerations of the ethics and robopsychological aspects of robotics.
 Tool Center Point (TCP)   – origin of the tool coordinate system.
 Uncanny valley  – hypothesized point at which humanoid robot behavior and appearance is so close to that of actual humans yet not precise or fully featured enough as to cause a sense of revulsion.

Robotics companies

Robotics organizations 

 FIRST (For Inspiration and Recognition of Science and Technology)  – organization founded by inventor Dean Kamen in 1989 in order to develop ways to inspire students in engineering and technology fields. It founded various robotics competitions for elementary and high school students.
 IEEE Robotics and Automation Society
 Robotics Institute
 SRI International

Robotics competitions 

Robot competition
 National ElectroniX Olympiad
 ABU Robocon
 BEST Robotics
 Botball
 DARPA Grand Challenge – prize competition for American autonomous vehicles, funded by the Defense Advanced Research Projects Agency, the most prominent research organization of the United States Department of Defense.
 DARPA Grand Challenge (2004)
 DARPA Grand Challenge (2005)
 DARPA Grand Challenge (2007)
 DARPA Robotics Challenge – prize competition funded by the US Defense Advanced Research Projects Agency. Held from 2012 to 2014, it aims to develop semi-autonomous ground robots that can do "complex tasks in dangerous, degraded, human-engineered environments."
 Initial task requirements
 Drive a utility vehicle at the site
 Travel dismounted across rubble
 Remove debris blocking an entryway
 Open a door and enter a building
 Climb an industrial ladder and traverse an industrial walkway
 Use a tool to break through a concrete panel
 Locate and close a valve near a leaking pipe
 Connect a fire hose to a standpipe and turn on a valve
 Teams making the finals
 SCHAFT
 IHMC Robotics
 Tartan Rescue
 MIT
 RoboSimian
 Team TRACLabs
 WRECS
 TROOPER
 Defcon Robot Contest
 Duke Annual Robo-Climb Competition
 Eurobot
 European Land-Robot Trial
 FIRST Junior Lego League
 FIRST Lego League
 FIRST Robotics Competition
 FIRST Tech Challenge
 International Aerial Robotics Competition
 Micromouse
 RoboCup
 Robofest
 RoboGames
 RoboSub
 Student Robotics
 UAV Outback Challenge
 World Robot Olympiad

People influential in the field of robotics 

 Asimov, Isaac – science fiction author who coined the term "robotics", and wrote the three laws of robotics.
 Čapek, Karel  – Czech author who coined the term "robot" in his 1921 play, Rossum's Universal Robots.

Robotics in popular culture 
 Droid
 List of fictional cyborgs
 List of fictional robots and androids
 List of fictional gynoids
 Real Robot
 Super Robot
 Robot Hall of Fame
 Waldo  –  a short story by Robert Heinlein, that gave its name to a popular nickname for remote manipulators.

See also 
 Outline of automation
 Outline of machines
 Outline of technology

References

External links 

 
 Autonomous Programmable Robot
 Four-leg robot
 Robotics Resources at CMU
 Society of Robots

Research
 The evolution of robotics research
 Human Machine Integration Laboratory at Arizona State University
 International Foundation of Robotics Research (IFRR)
 International Journal of Robotics Research (IJRR)
 Robotics and Automation Society (RAS) at IEEE
 Robotics Network at IET
 Robotics Division at NASA
 Robotics and Intelligent Machines at Georgia Tech
 Robotics Institute at Carnegie Mellon
 Robotics at Imperial College London

Robotics
Robotics
-Robotics
 Robotics